Dame Sara Elizabeth Cockerill (born 7 November 1968) is a British High Court judge.

Early life and education 
Cockerill was born in Weston-super-Mare, England and was educated at Lady Eleanor Holles School, funded by the Assisted Places Scheme. She studied at St Anne's College, Oxford and completed a first-class BA in jurisprudence in 1989. She was an Eldon Scholar in 1990.

Career 
In 1990, Cockerill was called to the bar at Lincoln's Inn, and practised at the bar from Essex Court Chambers and Four Essex Court, specialising in commercial law and compelled evidence. She took silk in 2011 and served as a deputy High Court judge from 2016 to 2017. Having been from 2011 a contributor to the White Book, she has been a member of its senior editorial board since 2020. She wrote Compelled Evidence in Civil Proceedings in 2011.

In addition to legal publications, Cockerill has written books on medieval history, including Eleanor of Castile: the Shadow Queen in 2014 and Eleanor of Aquitaine: Queen of France and England, Mother of Empires in 2019.

High Court appointment 
On 1 November 2017, she was appointed a judge of the High Court and assigned to the Queen's Bench Division. She received the customary damehood in 2017. She is authorised to hear cases on the Financial List, at the Competition Appeal Tribunal and the Administrative Court, and does general Queen's Bench work. Since 2020, she has been Judge in Charge of the Commercial Court.

Personal life 
In 1997, she married Nigel Eaton.

References 

Living people
1968 births
British women judges
Dames Commander of the Order of the British Empire
Alumni of St Anne's College, Oxford
Members of Lincoln's Inn
People educated at Lady Eleanor Holles School
Queen's Bench Division judges
21st-century English judges